Niger is a landlocked nation in West Africa located along the border between the Sahara and Sub-Saharan regions. Its geographic coordinates are longitude 16°N and latitude 8°E. Its area is 1.267 million square kilometers, of which 1 266 700 km2 is land and 300 km2 water, making Niger slightly less than twice the size of France.

Brief history
Niger, which attained independence from France in 1960 was under military regime till 1991. On public demand Gen. Ali Saibou held multiparty elections in 1993 and soon democracy came into effect in 1993. However, political unrest was caused by Col. Ibrahim Bare who staged a coup in 1996, but he later died in a counter insurgency operations by officers of the military establishment in 1999. This was followed by fresh elections for a democratic rule, and Mamadou Tandja assumed power in December 1999. Tandja, who won the elections in 2004 and in 2009, wanted to bring about a constitutional amendment to extend his tenure as president. However, in February 2010, he was removed from the post of the president in a coup engineered by the military and the constitution was annulled. Soon after, in 2011, elections were held and Mahamadou Issoufou got elected as the president and was sworn in April 2011.
Niger's problem with rebellious groups continued during 2007 and 2008. Rebellion was controlled. However, its security problems with its neighbors such as Libya, Nigeria and Mali have been a cause for concern

Geography
Niger, with a land area of 1.267 million km2, is a land locked country which is bounded with a land boundary of 5,834 km by seven countries: Algeria (951 km), Benin (277 km), Burkina Faso (622 km), Chad (1,196 km), Libya (342 km), Mali 838 km, and Nigeria (1,608) km.

Regions

Niger is divided into 7 Regions (French: régions; singularrégion). Each department's capital is the same as its name.

The national capital, Niamey, comprises a capital district.

Departments

The Regions of Niger are subdivided into 63 Departments.

Communes

The 63 Departments are broken down into Communes. As of 2006 there were 265 communes, including communes urbaines (Urban Communes: centred in or as subdivisions of cities of over 10000), communes rurales (Rural Communes) centred in cities of under 10,000 and/or sparsely populated areas, and a variety of traditional (clan or tribal) bodies amongst semi-nomadic populations.

Cities

Roadways

Physical geography

Agricultural geography

Some of the land in Niger is used as arable land (660 km2 of land in Niger is irrigated) and as pasture. There are some forests and woodland. The table below describes land use in Niger, as of 2011.

Climate

Niger's climate is largely hot and dry, with most of the country in a desert region. The terrain is predominantly desert plains and sand dunes. There are also large plains in the south and hills in the north. In the extreme south, there is a tropical climate near the edges of the Niger River Basin. Lake Chad at the southeast corner of the country is shared between Niger, Nigeria, Chad, and Cameroon.

Current issues
Current environmental issues in Niger include overgrazing, soil erosion, deforestation, desertification, recurring droughts, and endangered wildlife populations (such as the African elephant, Northwest African cheetah, West African giraffe, and Addax), which are threatened because of poaching and habitat destruction.

Natural hazards

Recurring droughts are a serious challenge for Niger. The 2012 Sahel drought, along with failed crops, insect plagues, high food prices and conflicts is currently affecting Niger causing a hunger crisis. Many families in Niger, still recovering from the 2010 Sahel famine, are being affected by the 2012 Sahel drought.

The 2005–06 Niger food crisis created a severe, but localized food security crisis in the regions of northern Maradi, Tahoua, Tillabéri, and Zinder of Niger from 2005 to 2006. It was caused by an early end to the 2004 rains, desert locust damage to some pasture lands, high food prices, and chronic poverty.

Extreme points
Northernmost point: Tripoint with Algeria and Libya, Agadez Region: 23°31'N.
Southernmost point: Benin/Niger/Nigeria tripoint, Dosso Region: 11°42'N
Easternmost point: border with Chad, Agadez Region: 16°00'E
Westernmost point: border with Mali and Burkina Faso, Tillabéri Region: 0°07'E
Highest point: Mont Idoukal-n-Taghès, Aïr Massif, Agadez Region:
Lowest point: Niger River at Nigeria border, Dosso Region:

International agreements
Niger is a party to the following agreements:

Biodiversity
Climate Change
Desertification
Endangered species
Environmental Modification
Hazardous Wastes
Nuclear Test Ban
Ozone Layer Protection
Sustainable development goals
Wetlands

Niger has signed, but not ratified the Kyoto Protocol and Law of the Sea.

National parks and reserves

Niger's protected areas comprise about 7.7 percent of the total land area. Six of the reserves are fully categorized under the International Union for Conservation of Nature (IUCN).

Natural resources

Niger possesses the following natural resources:

Uranium
Coal
Iron ore
Tin
Phosphates
Gold
Molybdenum
Gypsum
Salt
Oil

Waterways

Wildlife

Political geography

Surrounded by seven other countries, Niger has a total of 5,834 km of borders. The longest border is with Nigeria to the south, at 1,608 km. This is followed by Chad to the east (1,196 km), Algeria to the north-northwest (951 km), and Mali to the west (838 km). Niger also has short borders in its far southwest frontier (Burkina Faso at 622 km and Benin at 277 km) and to the north-northeast (Libya at 342 km).

See also

 Departments of Niger
 List of national parks of Niger
 Outline of Niger
 Regions of Niger

References

Further reading
L. Herrmann, K. Stahr and K. Vennemann. Atlas of Natural and Agronomic Resources of Niger and Benin, "Deutsche Forschungsgemeinschaft" (German Research Foundation), the University of Hohenheim. (No date). Retrieved 2008-02-22.